Judge Irwin may refer to:

Leo H. Irwin (1917–1995), judge of the United States Tax Court
Stephen Irwin (judge) (born 1953), British Lord Justice of Appeal
Thomas Irwin (American politician) (1785–1870), judge of the United States District Court for the Western District of Pennsylvania